St. Paul's Episcopal Church is a historic church at 637 2nd Avenue in Yuma, Arizona, United States.  It was built in 1909 and added to the National Register of Historic Places in 1982. It currently serves as a cultural center.

Its Arizona State historic property registration describes it:Stylistically, St. Paul's Episcopal Church is unique among the institutional structures in Yuma. Its most distinctive features include a broad shingled roof, rusticated masonry base, and articulated framing in the porch – all characteristics of the Shingle Style and its derivative the Western Stick Style. As both of these styles are more commonly associated with residential design its use for St. Paul's is exceptional. However, since the church is situated in the midst of a residential area with many Bungaloid homes, the design) of the church was quite appropriate.

See also
 List of historic properties in Yuma, Arizona 
 National Register of Historic Places listings in Yuma County, Arizona

References

External links
 

Buildings and structures in Yuma, Arizona
Episcopal church buildings in Arizona
Churches completed in 1909
Shingle Style architecture in Arizona
Churches on the National Register of Historic Places in Arizona
National Register of Historic Places in Yuma County, Arizona